Matthew Larkin (born 19 August 1964) is a former Australian rules footballer who played for the North Melbourne Football Club.

A midfielder, Larkin appeared 172 times for the Kangaroos in the VFL/AFL between 1984 and 1993. He captained the club for three seasons in the early 1990s.

From 1985 until 1988 he won three of the four North Melbourne best and fairest awards. He had been recruited from Boronia.

References

External links

1964 births
Living people
Australian rules footballers from Victoria (Australia)
North Melbourne Football Club players
Syd Barker Medal winners
Werribee Football Club players
Victorian State of Origin players